Stevie Darrell Anderson (born May 12, 1970) is a former American football wide receiver who played in the National Football League (NFL).

College career
Anderson played college football at Grambling State for four seasons. He averaged nearly 28 yards per reception over his junior and senior seasons.

Professional career
Anderson was selected by the Phoenix Cardinals in the eighth round of the 1993 NFL Draft. He was cut during training camp and was later signed to the New York Jets practice squad. Anderson made the team in 1994 and caught nine passes for 90 yards. He was waived by the Jets during training camp the following season. Anderson was claimed off waivers by the Cardinals. He spent two seasons with the team before he was cut during training camp in 1997. Anderson finished his NFL career with 16 receptions for 188 yards and one touchdown.

Personal life
Anderson's two of Anderson's brothers, Scotty Anderson and Anthony Anderson, both played in the NFL. He and Scotty were both victims of a stabbing during an altercation in 2003 with Stevie being placed in critical condition.

References

1970 births
Living people
American football wide receivers
Grambling State Tigers football players
Players of American football from Louisiana
New York Jets players
Arizona Cardinals players
Phoenix Cardinals players